The Roman Catholic Diocese of Bayeux and Lisieux (Latin: Dioecesis Baiocensis et Lexoviensis; French: Diocèse de Bayeux et Lisieux) is a diocese of the Catholic Church in France. It is coextensive with the Department of Calvados and is a suffragan to the Archdiocese of Rouen, which is also in Normandy.

At the time of the Concordat of 1802, the ancient Diocese of Lisieux was united to that of Bayeux. A pontifical brief in 1854 authorized the Bishop of Bayeux to call himself Bishop of Bayeux and Lisieux.

History

A local legend, found in the breviaries of the 15th century, makes St. Exuperius to be an immediate disciple of St. Clement (Pope from 88 to 99), and thus the first Bishop of Bayeux.  His see would therefore be a foundation of the 1st century. St. Regnobertus, the same legend tells us, was the successor of St. Exuperius. But the Bollandists, Jules Lair, and Louis Duchesne found no ground for this legend; it was only towards the end of the 4th century or beginning of the 5th century that Exuperius might have founded the See of Bayeux.

Certain successors of St. Exuperius were honored as popular saints: Referendus, Rufinianus, and Lupus (about 465); Vigor (beginning of the 6th century), who destroyed a pagan temple, then still frequented; Regnobertus (about 629), who founded many churches, and whom the legend, owing to an anachronism, made first successor to Exuperius; and Hugues (d. 730), simultaneously bishop of two other sees, Paris and Rouen.

An important bishop was Odo of Bayeux (1050–97), brother of William the Conqueror, who built the cathedral, was present at the Battle of Hastings, who was imprisoned in 1082 for attempting to lead an expedition to Italy to overthrow Pope Gregory VII, and who died a crusader in Sicily; Cardinal Agostino Trivulzio (1531–48), papal legate in the Roman Campagna, who was trapped in the Castel Sant'Angelo during the siege and pillage of Rome by the Imperial forces led by the Constable de Bourbon; Arnaud Cardinal d'Ossat (1602–04), a prominent diplomat identified with the conversion of Henry IV of France from Protestantism to Catholicism (the second time). Claude Fauchet, who after being court preacher to Louis XVI, became one of the "conquerors" of the Bastille, was chosen Constitutional Bishop of Bayeux in 1791, and was beheaded 31 October 1793. Léon-Adolphe Amette, Archbishop of Paris was, until 1905, Bishop of Bayeux.

In the Middle Ages Bayeux and neighbouring Lisieux were very important sees. The Bishop of Bayeux was senior among the Norman bishops, and the chapter was one of the richest in France.

Important councils were held within this diocese, one at Caen, in 1042, summoned by Duke William ('the Conqueror') and the bishops of Normandy. The Truce of God was proclaimed, not for the first time. Again in 1061 a council was summoned, again by Duke William, commanding the attendance of both clergy and laity (bishops, abbots, political and military leaders). The statutes of a synod held at Bayeux about 1300, furnish a very fair idea of the discipline of the time.

In the Diocese of Bayeux are the Abbey of St. Stephen (Abbaye-aux-Hommes) and the Abbey of the Holy Trinity (Abbaye-aux-Dames), both founded at Caen by William the Conqueror (1029–87) and his wife Matilda, in expiation of their unlawful marriage. The Abbey of Saint-Étienne was first governed by Lanfranc (1066–1070), who afterwards became Archbishop of Canterbury. Other abbeys were those of Troarn of which Durand, the successful opponent of Berengarius, was abbot in the 11th century; and the Abbaye du Val, of which Armand-Jean de Rancé (1626–1700) was abbot, in 1661, prior to his reform of La Trappe Abbey. The Abbey of St. Evroul (Ebrulphus) in the Diocese of Lisieux, founded about 560 by St. Evroul, a native of Bayeux, was the home of Ordericus Vitalis, the chronicler (1075–1141).

In 1308 Bishop Guillaume Bonnet was founder of the Collège de Bayeux in Paris, which was intended to house students from the dioceses of Bayeux, Mans, and Angers, who were studying medicine or civil law.

Saint Jean Eudes founded in 1641 in Caen the Congregation of Notre Dame de Charité du Refuge, which was devoted to the protection of reformed prostitutes. The mission of the nuns has been expanded since that time, to include other services to girls and women, including education. In 1900 the Order included 33 establishments in France and elsewhere, each an independent entity. At Tilly, in the Diocese of Bayeux, Michel Vingtras established, in 1839, the politico-religious society known as La Miséricorde, in connexion with the survivors of La Petite Eglise, which was condemned in 1843 by Gregory XVI. Daniel Huet, the famous savant (1630–1721) and Bishop of Avranches, was a native of Caen.

Bishop de Nesmond authorized the establishment of the priests of the Congregation of the Mission of Saint-Lazare in the diocese of Bayeux in 1682.

During World War I, the diocese of Bayeux sent 260 priests and 75 seminarians into military service. Seventeen priests and sixteen seminarians died. In c. 1920 there were 716 parishes in the diocese.

Bishops

To 1000

Exuperius 390? – 405?
Regnobertus
Rufinianus ...–434
Lupus c. 434 – c. 464
Patricius  464?–469?
 Manveus  470?–480?
Contestus 480–513
Vigor (Vigorus) 513–537
Leucadius c. 538 – after 549
Lascivus
Leodoaldus or Leudovald c. 581 – c. 614
Gérétran of Bayeux (Geretrandus) or Gertran c. 615
Ragnobertus 625–668
 Gereboldus Gerbold 689–691
Framboldus 691?–722?
Hugo of Champagne 723–730 
Leodeningus, c. 765
Thior (Thiorus)
Careviltus (Carveniltus) c. 833
Harimbert or Ermbart 835–837
Saint Sulpice (Sulpicius) 838–844
Baltfridus c. 843–858
[Tortoldus 859]
 Erchambert 859–c. 876
Henricus (I.) c. 927–after 933
Richard (I.) 
Hugo (II.) c. 965
Radulfus, Radulphus 986–1006

1000 to 1300

Hugo III. d'Ivry 1011/1015–1049 
Odo of Bayeux 1049–1097 
Turold de Brémoy (Turoldus) or d'Envermeu 1097–1106
Richard (II.) of Dover  1107–1133
Richard (III.) of Gloucester 1135–1142
Philippe d'Harcourt  1142–1163
Henri (II.) 1163–1205
Robert des Ablèges 1206–1231
Thomas de Freauville 1232–1238
 Sede vacante (1238–1241)
Guy 1241–1260
Eudes de Lory (Odo de Lorris) 1263–1274
Gregory of Naples 1274–1276
Pierre de Beneis 1276–1306

1300–1500

Guillaume (I.) Bonnet 1306–1312
Guillaume (II.) de Trie 1312–1324
Pierre (II.) de Lévis. 1324–1330
Guillaume (III.) de Beaujeu 1330–1337
Guillaume (IV.) Bertrand 1338–1347
Pierre (III.) de Villaine 1347–1360
Louis (I.) Thézart 1360–1373
Milon de Dormans 1374–1375
Nicolas du Bos 1375–1408
Jean de Boissey or Jehan de Boissey 1408–1412
Jean Langret 1412–1419
Nicolaus II. Habart 1421–1431
Zanon de Castiglione 1434–1459
Ludwig II. d'Harcourt or Louis de Harcourt 1460–1479
Charles de Neufchâtel 1480–1498
René de Prie 1498–1516

1500–1800

Louis de Canossa, O.Cist. 1516–1531
Pierre (IV.) de Martigny 1531
Agostino Trivulzio 1531–1548 (Administrator)
Charles II. d'Humières 1549–1571
Bernardin de Saint-François 1573–1582
Mathurin de Savonnières, O.S.A. 1583–1586
Charles de Bourbon 1586–1590 (Administrator)
 Sede vacante (1590–1598)
René de Daillon du Lude 1590–1600 (Administrator of temporalities?, 1590–1598)
Arnault d'Ossat 1600–1604
Jacques d'Angennes 1606–1647
Édouard Molé 1647–1652
François I. Servien 1654–1659
François II de Nesmond 1661–1715
Joseph-Emmanuel de la Tremoille 1716–1718
François Armand of Lothringen-Armagnac 1719–1728
Paul d'Albert de Luynes 1729–1753
Pierre-Jules César de Rochechouart-Montigny 1753–1776
Joseph-Dominique de Cheylus 1776–1797
Claude Fauchet 1791–1793 (Constitutional Bishop)
Julien-Jean-Baptiste Duchemin 1796–1798 (Constitutional Bishop)
Louis-Charles Bisson 1799–1801 (Constitutional Bishop)

From 1800
 Charles Brault (9 Apr 1802 Appointed – 8 Aug 1817
 Jean de Pradelles (1817–1818)
 Charles-François Duperrier-Dumourier (13 Jan 1823 Appointed – 17 Apr 1827 Died)
 Jean-Charles-Richard Dancel  (2 Jun 1827 Appointed – 20 Apr 1836 Died)
 Louis-François Robin (25 May 1836 Appointed – 30 Dec 1855 Died)
 Charles-Nicolas-Pierre Didiot (7 Apr 1856 Appointed – 15 Jun 1866 Died)
 Flavien-Abel-Antoinin Hugonin (13 Jul 1866 Appointed – 2 May 1898 Died)
 Léon-Adolphe Amette  (8 Jul 1898 Appointed – 21 Feb 1906
 Thomas-Paul-Henri Lemonnier (13 Jul 1906 Appointed – 29 Dec 1927 Died)
 Emmanuel Célestin Suhard (6 Jul 1928 Appointed – 23 Dec 1930
 François-Marie Picaud (12 Sep 1931 Appointed – 5 Aug 1954 Retired)
 André Jacquemin (29 Oct 1954 Succeeded – 10 Dec 1969 Resigned)
 Jean-Marie-Clément Badré (10 Dec 1969 Appointed – 19 Nov 1988 Retired)
 Pierre Auguste Gratien Pican, S.D.B. (19 Nov 1988 Succeeded – 12 Mar 2010 Retired)
 Jean-Claude Boulanger (12 Mar 2010 Appointed – 27 Jun 2020 Retired)
 Jacques Léon Jean Marie Habert (10 Nov 2020 Appointed – present)

See also
Catholic Church in France

Notes

Bibliography

Reference works
  (Use with caution; obsolete)
  (in Latin) 
 (in Latin) 
 
 
 

 [lists of benefices]

Studies

Farcy, Paul de (1887). Les abbayes de l'évêché de Bayeux. Tome I: Cerisy—Cordillon—Fontenay—Longues (Laval: L. Moreau 1887) 

Lair, Jules (1867). "Études sur les origines de l'évêché de Bayeux, III" 
 [a defense of tradition and legend by the Vicar of Vaucelles]

Acknowledgment

Goyau, Georges. "Bayeux." The Catholic Encyclopedia. Vol. 2. New York: Robert Appleton Company, 1907, pp. 358–359. Retrieved: 26 Jun. 2017.

External links

  Centre national des Archives de l'Église de France, L'Épiscopat francais depuis 1919 , retrieved: 2016-12-24.

Bayeux